is a Japanese four-character compound describing unity of horse and rider which is pertinent to Yabusame, Japanese mounted archery. It is also the design philosophy of Mazda.

References

Japanese words and phrases
Japanese martial arts terminology
Cavalry
Mazda